Acropora microclados is a species of acroporid coral that was first described by Christian Gottfried Ehrenberg in 1834. It is listed as a vulnerable species on the IUCN Red List, and its population is decreasing. It is uncommon but found over a large area, including in five regions of Indonesia, and is classified under CITES Appendix II.

Description
The structures consist of branchlets, which are short, become thin at the ends, and orderly, and the width of the branchlet bases can reach . It is usually pale pink/brown in colour, and its tentacles extend during the day, and are grey. Branchlets contain axial, incipient axial, and radial corallites. Axial corallites are located at the end of branchlets, and are tube-shaped. Incipient axial corallites frequently occur. The radial corallites occur up the sides of the branchlets, are tube-shaped, close together, and each contains nose-shaped openings. It looks similar to Acropora lamarcki, Acropora macrostoma, and Acropora massawensis. It is composed of aragonite (calcium carbonate).

Distribution
Acropora microclados is found over a large range and is uncommon; the Indo-Pacific Ocean, the Red Sea, the Indian Ocean, the Gulf of Aden, the East China Sea, the West Pacific, the Cook Islands, Australia, Japan, Southeast Asia, Samoa, and Chagos. It occurs in five regions of Indonesia. There is a lack of population data for the coral, but numbers are believed to be declining. It is threatened by climate change, rising sea temperatures causing bleaching, reef destruction, coral disease, being prey to starfish Acanthaster planci, and human activity. It is classed as a vulnerable species on the IUCN Red List, is listed under CITES Appendix II, and might occur within Marine Protected Areas.

Taxonomy
It was first described by Christian Gottfried Ehrenberg in 1834 as Heteropora microclados.

References

Acropora
Cnidarians of the Indian Ocean
Cnidarians of the Pacific Ocean
Fauna of the Red Sea
Marine fauna of Africa
Marine fauna of Asia
Marine fauna of Oceania
Marine fauna of Southeast Asia
Marine fauna of Western Asia
Anthozoa of Australia
Vulnerable fauna of Asia
Vulnerable fauna of Oceania
Corals described in 1834
Taxa named by Christian Gottfried Ehrenberg